Ozothamnus stirlingii, commonly known as Ovens everlasting, is a flowering plant in the family Asteraceae and grows in New South Wales, Victoria and the Australian Capital Territory. It has globose-shaped white flower heads and sticky leaves.

Description
The outer bracts slightly reflexed, hard, yellowish, oval-shaped with woolly edges, inner bracts with a white lamina.

Taxonomy and naming
The species was described in 1889 by Ferdinand von Mueller who gave it the name Helichrysum stirlingii. In 1991 Arne A. Anderberg changed the name to Ozothamnus stirlingii and the description was published in Opera Botanica.
The specific epithet (stirlingii) was in honour of Edward Charles Stirling.

Distribution and habitat
Ovens everlasting  grows at higher altitudes in montane forests and subalpine woodland in New South Wales, Victoria and the Australian Capital Territory.

References

stirlingii
Asterales of Australia
Flora of New South Wales
Flora of Victoria (Australia)
Flora of the Australian Capital Territory